The Psychotherapy and Counselling Federation of Australia (PACFA) is the umbrella professional body that plays a self-regulating role in the psychotherapy and counselling industry. It represents the interests of more than 3000 practitioners of various forms of psychotherapy and counselling in Australia. It cooperates with 40 related associations to set and meet standards in all states and territories of Australia. The counselling profession in Australia is currently not government regulated so clients are faced with the task of evaluating qualifications of various counsellors and psychotherapists. PACFA is one of two industry associations that is campaigning for government accreditation of counselling in Australia.

See also

Australian Psychological Society
Australian Counselling Association
United Kingdom Council for Psychotherapy

External links
 PACFA main web site
 
 PACFA Member Associations - Queensland Cousellors Association

References

Mental health organisations in Australia